is a Japanese three-part television mini-series, shown on Fuji TV from April 9, 2010 to April 11, 2010 to celebrate its 50th Anniversary. The show was known for its star-studded cast.

Synopsis
Masako (Kou Shibasaki) is the eldest daughter of the Yame family, living in Fukuoka, Kyushu. She leaves school to help support her good, but naive parents and four siblings. The drama centers on the family members and people they meet in the post-war Japan. The story takes place between 1945 and 1964, chronicling the lives of the seven members of the fictional Yame family.

Cast
Kou Shibasaki as Masako Yame
Kōichi Satō as Taizo Onizuka
Seishiro Kato as Minoru Yame
Jun Matsumoto as Yoshio Yame
Ryuta Sato as Muneo Yame
Maki Horikita as Namiko Yame
Mio Miyatake as young Namiko
Nana Eikura as Fusako Yame
Masami Nagasawa as Yukari Ichinose
Yo Oizumi as Tsuru
Tetsuji Tamayama as Ryugo Oura
Koji Yamamoto as Mitsunari Ano
Sawa Suzuki as Maria
Junji Takada as Miyoji Koga
Yūki Amami as Chiaki Onizuka
Sumiko Fuji as Maki Yame
Toshiyuki Nishida as Tokijiro Yame
Kenji Anan as Manager of a host club Nagaiyoru

Prominent and other figures of the Showa Era
Noritake Kinashi (Tunnels) as Kenichi Enomoto
Akiyoshi Nakao as Hideo Murata
Emi Wakui as Machiko Hasegawa
Takuzō Kadono as Shigeru Yoshida
Tatsuya Fujiwara as Osamu Tezuka
Shun Oguri as Ken Takakura
Masanobu Takashima as Hideo Itokawa
Tomomitsu Yamaguchi as Rikidozan
Keiko Toda as Shizuko Kasagi
Shinji Takeda as Yoshio Shirai
Takashi Ukaji as Akira Kurosawa
Takayuki Yamada as Tatsuya Nakadai
Shirō Itō as Roppa Furukawa
Norito Yashima as Shusaku Endo
Eiji Wentz as Akihiro Maruyama
Saki Aibu as Misora Hibari
Maya Sakura as Misora Hibari (child)
Masaaki Uchino as Kozo Masuda
Muga Tsukaji as Kiyoshi Yamashita
Koji Ishizaka as Kafū Nagai
Fumiyo Kohinata as Nobusuke Kishi
Zina Blausova as Marilyn Monroe
Masaki Okada as Masashi Miyazaki (fictional figure)
Susumu Terajima as Shoji Hiiragi (fictional figure)
Kiichi Nakai as Juichi Shishimaru (fictional figure)

Episode ratings

Source:

References

External links
  

Japanese drama television series
2010 in Japanese television
Fuji TV original programming
Television shows written by Kôki Mitani
Japanese television miniseries